Opatovac  is a village in Croatia. It is connected by the D2 highway.

See also
 Church of St. George, Opatovac

Populated places in Vukovar-Syrmia County
Populated places on the Danube
Populated places in Syrmia